Dedicated is the eleventh studio album by The Marshall Tucker Band. It was "dedicated" to their former bassist and founding member, Tommy Caldwell, who was killed from injuries sustained in a car crash the previous year, and the other Caldwell brother, Timmy, who died under similar circumstances, and to all lost loved ones.

Track listing
All songs written by Toy Caldwell, except where noted.

"Rumors Are Raging" – 4:10 (Toy Caldwell, Paul Riddle)
"Tonight's The Night (For Making Love)" – 3:57 (George McCorkle)
"Love Some" – 2:55 (Alan Tarney, Trevor Spencer)
"Silverado" – 4:10 (McCorkle)
"Something's Missing In My Life" – 3:31
"This Time I Believe" – 3:19
"Tell The Blues To Take Off The Night" – 4:51
"Special Someone" – 4:01
"The Time Has Come" – 2:45
"Ride In Peace – Dedicated to Tim and Tommy Caldwell and to All Lost Loved Ones" – 3:58

Personnel

 Toy Caldwell – Guitars, Steel Guitar, Background Vocals
 Doug Gray – Vocals
 Jerry Eubanks – Flute, Saxophone, Keyboards, Background Vocals
 Paul Riddle – Drums, Percussion, Background Vocals
 George McCorkle – Guitars
 Franklin Wilkie – Bass Guitar, Background Vocals

Guest musicians 
 Charlie Daniels – Fiddle
 Norton Buffalo – Harmonica

References

Marshall Tucker Band albums
1981 albums
Albums produced by Tom Dowd